The Red Zone is a six-episode comedy television series thar was slated to appear on Netflix in 2021. It was written by sports journalists Jonathan Liew and Barney Ronay and executive produced by Sam Mendes, Pippa Harris, and Nicolas Brown via Neal Street Productions.

In March, 2022 the project was announced as discontinued due to a combination of factors including the success of the Ted Lasso series and changes in the television industry from the COVID-19 pandemic.

References

2020s British comedy television series
English-language Netflix original programming